Helmholtz flow is a term used in fluid mechanics for flow with free streamlines or vortex sheets.

See also
 Kelvin–Helmholtz instability

References

Fluid dynamic instabilities